William W. Hall is the chair of medical microbiology and professor emeritus at the Centre for Research in Infectious Diseases at University College Dublin.

He is one of the founders  of the Global Virus Network, along with Robert Gallo and Reinhard Kurth, of the Robert Koch Institute.

Career 
Hall earned his B.Sc.(Biochemistry) and Ph.D. (Biochemistry/ Virology) from Queen's University Belfast and his M.D. from Cornell University Medical College in New York.

He began his career as an Assistant Professor of Medicine at Cornell University. Later he worked as the Senior Physician and Director of the Clinical Research Centre at the Rockefeller University in New York. He was the former president of International Retrovirology Association. He was a member of the National Public Health Emergency Team for the Irish Government. He is the former Director of National Virus Reference Laboratory (NVRL).

Research 
He is known for his research in human retroviruses and the roles of viruses in the development of leukaemia and lymphoma.

His research was instrumental in the Molecular Characterization and identifying the genetic heterogeneity  of Human T Lymphotropic Virus Type II. His work proceeded onto animal models of viral diseases and molecular pathogenesis.

Personal life 
He is a photography enthusiast.
During a stay at The Old Sorting Office, Askrigg, Yorkshire Dales, he took a series of wildlife photographs that were later published in a book, called "Photographs of The Dales".

Awards 
The GVN Robert C. Gallo Award for Scientific Excellence and Leadership

References

Living people
Irish virologists
People associated with University College Dublin
Year of birth missing (living people)